Jayan Cherthala is an Indian actor in Malayalam cinema. He is from Cherthala, near Alappuzha, Kerala in India. He has performed in more than two dozen movies in Malayalam, and TV serials. He is the state president of Kerala Sarva Kala Sangam (KSKS) affiliated to AITUC.

Personal life 
Jayan's father, Raveendranathan Nair, was a  teacher. His mother, Sarala Bai and sister Sindhu are teachers. His stage name was adopted  from the village he came from, Cherthala. He is married to Jayasree and the couple have a son, Karthik Shiva.

Filmography 

All films are in Malayalam language unless otherwise noted.

Dubbing work

Television serials 
2003-2004: Swapnam
2004: Avicharitham 
2005: Kayamkulam Kochunni
2006: Summer in America 
2007-2009: Ente Manasaputhri as Thobiyas
2009: vigraham
2010:Snehatheeram
2015-2016: Eshwaran Saakshyiyayi
2015: Junior Chanakyan

References

External links
 

Living people
Male actors from Alappuzha
Indian male film actors
Male actors in Malayalam cinema
Malayalam film producers
Film producers from Kochi
20th-century Indian male actors
21st-century Indian male actors
1971 births